The Swedish Football Association have organized a nationwide knock-out cup competition known as Svenska Cupen for 60 years, first between 1941 and 1953 and then again from 1967 to present day. There have been a few years in these two periods when cup competition has not been held. The present cup holders are Östersunds FK, who beat IFK Norrköping in the 2017 final. It involves professional and amateur clubs of all standards playing against each other, creating the possibility for "minnows" to become "giant-killers" by eliminating top clubs from the tournament. 13 teams have reached the final while playing in a lower division, however two of these reached the final unhindered during the 1948 tournament when no first tier teams competed. All of the second tier teams have lost in the final except for Råå IF in 1948 and Degerfors IF in 1992–93, both of whom faced second tier opposition.

Malmö FF have a record 15 cup titles, followed by AIK who have eight titles. Malmö FF is also the club who have won most consecutive titles and the record of appearing in the most finals, they won three consecutive titles between 1972 and 1975 and having appeared in 18 finals. AIK have finished as runners-up for a record of eight times. Örebro SK are the team to have appeared in the most finals without winning the cup title, they have appeared and lost in two finals, their latest final was in 2015.

Winners

1941–1953

1967–Present

Performances

Performance by club

19 clubs have won Svenska Cupen. 23 clubs have been runners-up, and of these eight clubs are yet to win a cup final. Four of the 19 cup-winning clubs have never lost the competition's deciding game, but none of these have played in more than one final.

Total cup wins by city
The 19 title-winning clubs have come from a total of 13 cities. The most successful cities are Malmö and Stockholm. All of Malmö's titles have been won by Malmö FF, while AIK, Djurgårdens IF and Hammarby IF have won the title from Stockholm.

Total cup wins by county
There have been 19 winners of Svenska Cupen, from nine counties. The most successful county is Skåne with 22 titles divided between four clubs.

Footnotes

References

External links
  Swedish Football Association
  Sweden - List of Cup Finals, RSSSF.com

Winners
Cup